Tallkrogen subway station is on the green line of the Stockholm metro, located in Tallkrogen, Söderort. The station was inaugurated on 1 October 1950 as part of the inaugural stretch of Stockholm metro between Slussen and Hökarängen.

References

Green line (Stockholm metro) stations
Railway stations opened in 1950
1950 establishments in Sweden